The 1996 Daily Mirror/Sporting Life Greyhound Derby Final took place during May and June with the final being held on 29 June 1996 at Wimbledon Stadium.  The winner Shanless Slippy received £50,000. The competition was sponsored by the Sporting Life and Daily Mirror.

Final result 
At Wimbledon (over 480 metres):

Distances 
2½, 1½, short head, 3, short head (lengths)
The distances between the greyhounds are in finishing order and shown in lengths. One length is equal to 0.08 of one second.

Race Report
In the final Night Trooper broke well pursued by Clonmel Produce Stakes champion Shanless Slippy, the Irish dog then forged out a lead by the first bend and drew clear down the back straight. The 1995 Irish Greyhound Derby champion Batties Rocket was forced to check back at the third bend behind Trooper leaving Shanless Slippy clear. Shanless Slippy remained unbeaten throughout the event and Night Trooper took consolation by winning the Pall Mall Stakes the following year.

See also
1996 UK & Ireland Greyhound Racing Year

References

Greyhound Derby
English Greyhound Derby